Moberly Commercial Historic District is a national historic district located at Moberly, Randolph County, Missouri.  The district encompasses 89 contributing buildings in the central business district of Moberly.  It developed between about 1880 and 1963, and includes representative examples of Classical Revival, Colonial Revival, and Italianate style architecture. Notable buildings include the former Moberly Post Office (1915), Moberly Masonic Lodge, No. 344/Israel Shrine #13 (1929), Fourth Street Theatre (1913), and Carnegie Library (1903).

It was listed on the National Register of Historic Places in 2012.

References

Historic districts on the National Register of Historic Places in Missouri
Neoclassical architecture in Missouri
Colonial Revival architecture in Missouri
Italianate architecture in Missouri
Buildings and structures in Randolph County, Missouri
National Register of Historic Places in Randolph County, Missouri